Fiddlers Three is a play written by Agatha Christie in 1972. The play was first written and performed as Fiddlers Five, which toured briefly in 1971 after opening in Bristol. The revised version toured in the provinces for several weeks after its premiere at the Yvonne Arnaud Theatre in Guildford on 1 August 1972, but failed to meet with success.

Christie pushed for the play to be performed, much against the wishes of her daughter, Rosalind Hicks, who was protective of her mother's reputation and felt that this production would damage it. The revised version of the play incorporated several suggestions from its director, Allan Davis, who had seen the previous 1971 version.

The play was never transferred to the West End. It was directed by Allan Davis, with sets by Anthony Holland and lighting by Michael Saddington.

Cast
Julia Knight as Gina Jones 
Doris Hare as Sally Blunt
Raymond Francis as Sam Fletcher
Gábor Baraker as Felix Bogusian
Mark Wing-Davey as Henry Panhacker
John Boswall as Jonathan Panhacker
Suzanne Barrett as An Air Hostess
D. Williams Newton as Dr Nolan
Bruce Montague as A Waiter
Arthur Howard as Mr Trustcott
George Lacey as Mr Moss

References

1972 plays
Plays by Agatha Christie